Hawthorn Hill is a hamlet in Berkshire, England, within the civil parish of Warfield. Hawthorn Hill Racecourse was situated where Birds Hill Racecourse is today at the end of the Drift Road. It was built on a farm owned by Sir Robert Wilmot. National Hunt meetings started in 1888 and stopped in 1913. They began again in 1921, and were quite a social event during the Jazz Age. They finally ended in 1939.

Hamlets in Berkshire
Warfield
Bray, Berkshire